Camarie Boyce (born 15 October 1999) is a Barbadian cricketer. He made his List A debut on 7 November 2019, for the West Indies Emerging Team in the 2019–20 Regional Super50 tournament. He made his first-class debut on 7 February 2020, for Barbados in the 2019–20 West Indies Championship, taking a five-wicket haul in the first innings.

References

External links
 

1999 births
Living people
Barbadian cricketers
Barbados cricketers
West Indies Emerging Team cricketers
Place of birth missing (living people)